The Luoyang–Lushi Expressway, designated as G3615 and commonly abbreviated as Luolu Expressway, is  long national expressway in Henan, China linking Luoyang and Lushi County. This expressway is a branch of the G36 Nanjing-Luoyang Expressway.

History
This expressway was opened in December 31 2012, as a section of the S85 Zhengzhou–Lushi Expressway. In 2015, the designations of expressways in Henan was adjusted and the expressway was re-designated as S97, and was re-designated again in 2019 to S92. When China's 2022 highway plan was released, the route was upgraded to a national expressway and changed to G3615.

Detailed itinerary

References

Expressways in Henan
Transport in Henan